Janet L. Scott (April 1964 – 23 January 2022) was a South African chemist who was Professor of Sustainable Chemistry at the University of Bath. She also worked as the Director of the Engineering and Physical Sciences Research Council Centre for Doctoral Training in Sustainable Chemical Technologies.

Early life and education 
Scott was from South Africa. She studied chemistry and applied chemistry at the University of Natal. She moved to the University of Cape Town as a graduate student, where she earned a master's degree and a doctorate. Her doctoral research considered cholic acid and methyl cholate.

Research and career 
Scott joined the faculty at the University of Cape Town in 1992, where she worked until completing her doctorate in 1995. She joined the Fine Chemicals Corporation in South Africa in 1996. Scott moved to Monash University in 2000, where she worked as deputy director of the Australian Research Council Centre for Green Chemistry. In 2006 she was appointed a Senior Marie Curie Fellow at Unilever.

In 2010, Scott joined the Department of Chemistry at the University of Bath. Her research considered renewable raw materials for the development of sustainable products. In 2011, she developed a biodegradable microbead that could be used to replace dangerous plastic microbeads. She was particularly interested in making microbeads from cellulose, an abundant natural material that does not derive from fossil fuels. For several years she developed a reliable, scalable strategy to generate cellulose microbeads. She was made Reader in Sustainable Chemistry in 2016 and a Professor two years later. Scott launched Naturbeads, a spin off company for cellulose microbead generation, in 2018. Naturbeads was supported by Innovate UK and Sky Ocean Ventures.

Awards and honours 
 2004 Fellow of the Royal Society of Chemistry
 Royal Australian Chemical Society Green Chemistry Prize

Selected publications

Books

Personal life 
Scott left the University of Bath in 2020 due to ill health. She died in January 2022.

References 

1964 births
2022 deaths
South African chemists
White South African people
University of Cape Town alumni
University of Natal alumni
Academic staff of the University of Cape Town
Academics of the University of Bath